This page shows the standings and results for Group F of the UEFA Euro 2012 qualifying tournament.

Standings

Matches
Group F fixtures were to be finalised at a meeting between the participants in Athens, Greece on 7 March 2010. After that meeting proved inconclusive, the fixture list was determined by a random draw at the XXXIV Ordinary UEFA Congress in Tel Aviv, Israel, on 25 March.

Goalscorers

Discipline

References

Group F
2010–11 in Israeli football
2011–12 in Israeli football
2010 in Latvian football
2011 in Latvian football
2010–11 in Maltese football
2011–12 in Maltese football
2011–12 in Croatian football
2010–11 in Croatian football
Croatia at UEFA Euro 2012
2010–11 in Greek football
2011–12 in Greek football
Greece at UEFA Euro 2012
2010–11 in Georgian football
2011–12 in Georgian football